The 88th (Victoria Fusiliers) Battalion, CEF was a unit in the Canadian Expeditionary Force during the First World War.  Based in Victoria, British Columbia, the unit began recruiting in the autumn of 1915 in that city.  After sailing to England in June 1916, the battalion was absorbed into the 30th Reserve Battalion on July 18, 1916.  The 88th Battalion, CEF had one Officer Commanding: Lieut-Col. H. J. R. Cullin.

References
Meek, John F. Over the Top! The Canadian Infantry in the First World War. Orangeville, Ont.: The Author, 1971.

088
History of Victoria, British Columbia
Military units and formations of British Columbia
Canadian Scottish Regiment (Princess Mary's)